British Railways Standard Class 5 No. 73156 is a preserved British steam locomotive.  Its restoration at Loughborough on the Great Central Railway was completed in 2017, and it made its formal debut on 5 October 2017 in the guise of 73084 Tintagel.  73156 is the sole surviving BR Standard locomotive built at Doncaster Works. It had been allocated to two GCR sheds (Leicester and Woodford Halse)

Allocations:

73156 was withdrawn from Bolton on 24 October 1967, and was subsequently sold to Woodham Brothers scrapyard in South Wales, moving there in late January 1968.

Preservation 

73156 avoided the cutters torch at Woodham's, and was bought by the Bolton Steam Locomotive Co Ltd, moving from Barry in November 1985. 73156 was initially based at the East Lancashire Railway in Bury, (and indeed much of the associated rolling stock owned by members still lives there). 

The restoration inside the shed at Loughborough was completed in 2017, along with a new BR1B Tender to replace the original, which was sold off while the locomotive was at Barry. In the latter stages of restoration new components were manufactured and fitted to the cab. These were a duplex ejector, sanding valves and a blower, all of which are new to the design, similar to that of 60163 Tornado. This would make it more suitable for mainline work than the other four preserved Standard 5s, but the restoration group has not publicly released any intentions to do this.

References

External links 
 Great Central Railway locomotives – BR Standard Class 5 4-6-0 No.73156
 https://web.archive.org/web/20080919165643/http://www.73156standard5group.co.uk/   

73156
4-6-0 locomotives
5 73156
Locomotives saved from Woodham Brothers scrapyard
Railway locomotives introduced in 1956
Standard gauge steam locomotives of Great Britain